Tarras is a small farming settlement in Central Otago, in the South Island of New Zealand.

Tarras is located on the slopes above the upper reaches of the Clutha Valley, on State Highway 8. It is the first village reached by travellers heading south through the Lindis Pass, and is close to the junction where travellers from Aoraki / Mount Cook turn west towards Lake Hāwea, Wānaka, and Haast Pass / Tioripatea.

Farming and agriculture 

Most farms in the Tarras district run sheep, principally merino farmed for their super-fine wool. Some also raise other sheep breeds and deer. Many farms have converted to beef cattle since the 2010 introduction of large-scale irrigation.

Shrek, a hermit Merino sheep, was caught in the hills of Tarras on 15 April 2004, after hiding away in caves for six years. He was shorn live on national television, to produce fleece for men's coats. Shrek was euthanised on 6 June 2011 on a veterinarian's advice, at the age of 16.

Vineyards have been established in the area since 2000. The vineyards grow mainly pinot noir and riesling grapes, with some plantings of pinot gris. The Tarras vineyards include Maori Point Vineyard and Swallows Crossing Vineyard. They are formally classified as being in the Bendigo sub-region of the Central Otago wine region.

Sunny and dry climate

The valley around Tarras is the sunniest in Otago, with over 2,100 sunshine hours per year.

Community
The Anglican and Presbyterian Tarras Church includes kneelers created to celebrate the centennial of New Zealand women's suffrage.

Tarras Rural Women publish the community newsletter, Tarras Talk.

The Tarras Tearooms is a historic waystation for travellers through the Lindis Pass.

Education

The school has published a children's books about Shrek the sheep to raise funds for the school and its students. The book was written by school children and edited by teachers and parents.

Controversial international airport proposal

In July 2022, an investigative journalist revealed that Christchurch Airport had been secretly buying up farmland between highways  and  next to Tarras, with the intention of creating a new international airport. After the airport company was forced to announce their plans, there was widespread concern within the community and indeed throughout Central Otago about the proposed airport.

External links
 Tarras Community Trust
 Tarras School
 Learning from the Lindis

References 

Populated places in Otago